The Global Fleet Group is a large diversified conglomerate in West Africa.

Overview
The Global Fleet Group is a business conglomerate, that is headquartered in Lagos, Nigeria, with interests across a range of sectors in Africa. Current interests include oil and gas, airlines, magazines, insurance, hotels, resorts, real estate, petrol stations, manufacturing and banking. In the financial services sector, the Group owns 100% the shareholding in Energy Bank of Ghana and the former Oceanic Bank of São Tomé.

Subsidiary companies
The Global Fleet Group includes the following subsidiaries, among others:

 Air Nigeria - Lagos, Nigeria - Formerly Virgin Nigeria
 Nicon Insurance - Lagos, Nigeria
 Nigeria Re-Insurance Corporation - Lagos, Nigeria
 Nicon Luxury Hotel - Abuja, Nigeria - Formerly Le' Meridien Hotel
 The Nicon Group - Lagos, Nigeria - Holdings include investment companies, schools, real estate holdings, transport companies and others
 Nicon Properties Limited
 Global Fleet Oil and Gas - A chain of gasoline stations across Nigeria
 Global Fleet Building - Lagos, Nigeria - Formerly Allied Bank Building
 Nicon Hotels - Lagos, Nigeria
 Global Fleet Industries - Lagos, Nigeria - Formerly HFP Industries Limited
 Energy Bank - Accra, Ghana - A new commercial bank in Ghana, started operations in February 2011
 Energy Bank São Tomé - São Tomé, São Tomé and Príncipe - Commercial bank purchased from Oceanic Bank in May 2011 and rebranded to current name.
 Global Media Mirror Limited - Lagos, Nigeria

See also
 Air Nigeria
 Energy Bank
 Oceanic Bank

External links 
 Global Fleet Acquires Oceanic Bank Sao Tome
 Interview With Jimoh Ibrahim, Group Chairman & Chief Executive Officer
 Profile of Jimoh Ibrahim
 President Atta Mills of Ghana Commissions Energy Bank

References

Conglomerate companies of Nigeria
Companies based in Lagos
Conglomerate companies established in 2003
Nigerian companies established in 2003